Church going may refer to:

 Church attendance
 "Church Going", a poem by Philip Larkin, from his 1955 collectionThe Less Deceived
 Church Going (film), a 2007 film by Ashley Inglis and Russell Inglis, supported by the UK Film Council Completion Fund